Walid Hichri (born 5 March 1986 in Aryanah) is Tunisian footballer, who plays as a centre back for Avenir de la Marsa. From 2010 to 2013, he played for Espérance Sportive de Tunis in the Tunisian Ligue Professionnelle 1 as a defender.

References

External links
 
 Mtn football profile
 Goal profile

1986 births
Living people
Tunisian footballers
Tunisia international footballers
Association football defenders
Club Africain players
FC Saturn Ramenskoye players
CA Bizertin players
Espérance Sportive de Tunis players
Stade Tunisien players
FC Kyzylzhar players
US Monastir (football) players
2013 Africa Cup of Nations players
People from  Aryanah
Tunisia A' international footballers
2011 African Nations Championship players